Drostanolone, or dromostanolone, is an anabolic–androgenic steroid (AAS) of the dihydrotestosterone (DHT) group which was never marketed. An androgen ester prodrug of drostanolone, drostanolone propionate, was formerly used in the treatment of breast cancer in women under brand names such as Drolban, Masteril, and Masteron. This has also been used non-medically for physique- or performance-enhancing purposes.

Pharmacology

Pharmacodynamics

Like other AAS, drostanolone is an agonist of the androgen receptor (AR). It is not a substrate for 5α-reductase and is a poor substrate for 3α-hydroxysteroid dehydrogenase (3α-HSD), and therefore shows a high ratio of anabolic to androgenic activity. As a DHT derivative, drostanolone is not a substrate for aromatase and hence cannot be aromatized into estrogenic metabolites. While no data are available on the progestogenic activity of drostanolone, it is thought to have low or no such activity similarly to other DHT derivatives. Since the drug is not 17α-alkylated, it is not known to cause hepatotoxicity.

Chemistry

Drostanolone, also known as 2α-methyl-5α-dihydrotestosterone (2α-methyl-DHT) or as 2α-methyl-5α-androstan-17β-ol-3-one, is a synthetic androstane steroid and a derivative of DHT. It is specifically DHT with a methyl group at the C2α position.

History
Drostanolone and its ester drostanolone propionate were first described in 1959. Drostanolone propionate was first introduced for medical use in 1961.

Society and culture

Generic names
It has also been referred to as dromostanolone.

Legal status
Drostanolone, along with other AAS, is a schedule III controlled substance in the United States under the Controlled Substances Act.

Synthesis
Bolazine is when react 2 eq. with hydrazine to give dimer

Treatment of DHT (androstan-17β-ol-3-one, stanolone) [521-18-6] (1) with methyl formate and the strong base sodium methoxide gives [4033-95-8] (2). The newly added formyl function in the product is shown in the enol form. Catalytic hydrogenation reduces that function to a methyl group (3). The addition of hydrogen from the bottom face of the molecule leads to the formation of β-methyl isomer where the methyl group occupies the higher-energy axial position. Strong base-induced equilibration of the methyl group leads to the formation of the sterically favoured equatorial α-methyl isomer, affording dromostanolone (4).

References

External links 
 Masteron (drostanolone propionate) - William Llewellyn's Anabolic.org 

Cyclopentanols
Androgens and anabolic steroids
Androstanes
Ketones
World Anti-Doping Agency prohibited substances